Kyrlyk (Kırlık) is a rural locality (a selo) and the administrative centre of Kyrlykskoye Rural Settlement, Ust-Kansky District, the Altai Republic, Russia. The population was 1,006 as of 2016. There are 17 streets.

Geography 
Kyrlyk is located 21 km southeast of Ust-Kan (the district's administrative centre) by road. Mendur-Sokkon is the nearest rural locality.

References 

Rural localities in Ust-Kansky District